Biser, is an urban locality (an urban-type settlement) in Gornozavodsky District, Perm Krai, Russia. Population:

History 
The settlement was formed at Bisersky Zavod station (now Biser station) of Gornozavodskaya railway opened in 1878. The station was built 12 km to the north of Biser ironworks. 

Settlement of town type since December 20, 1991. Biser was the centre of Biser town council (from 1991 until January 2006).

Transportation
Biser lies on the railway from Solikamsk to Yekaterinburg. On 11 February 1924 the station was renamed Yemshanovo in honor of Alexander Ivanovich Yemshanov, the manager of the Perm Railway and a former (1920-21) People's Commissar of Communications (i.e. Transport) of the RSFSR. The name reverted to Biser after Yemshanov was shot in the Great Purge on 26 November 1937.

Climate
Biser has a subarctic climate (Köppen climate classification Dfc), with very cold winters and mild summers. Precipitation is quite high, and is heavier in summer and autumn than at other times of the year.

References

Urban-type settlements in Perm Krai
Populated places in Gornozavodsky District